Maksim Lipin (born 17 March 1992) is an Estonian professional footballer who plays as a midfielder.

Club career
Lipin has played for FC Kiviõli Irbis, FC Puuma Tallinn, FCI Tallinn, FCI Levadia Tallinn, FCI Levadia U21, JK Narva Trans, JK Sillamäe Kalev and PS Kemi. He left PS Kemi at the end of the 2018 season, returning to Estonia with Legion Tallinn.

International career
He played for Estonia at under-21 and under-23 youth levels.

References

External links

1992 births
Living people
Footballers from Tallinn
Estonian footballers
FC Kiviõli Irbis players
FC Puuma Tallinn players
FCI Tallinn players
FCI Levadia Tallinn players
FCI Levadia U21 players
JK Narva Trans players
JK Sillamäe Kalev players
Kemi City F.C. players
Esiliiga players
Meistriliiga players
Veikkausliiga players
Association football midfielders
Estonian expatriate footballers
Estonian expatriate sportspeople in Finland
Expatriate footballers in Finland
Tallinna JK Legion players
Estonia youth international footballers
Estonia under-21 international footballers